George McCabe (born 13 March 1922, Sheffield, Yorkshire; died January 2001) was an English association football referee, who officiated at the 1966 World Cup and in an FA Cup Final. He became a Football League referee in 1954 and an international referee in 1960. Throughout his league career he sent off only three players. Outside football he was the director of a Sheffield engineering company.

Career
McCabe, though awarded the 1969 FA Cup Final in his final match in England, is perhaps more well known for his handling of the Brazil versus Portugal World Cup match played at Goodison Park, Liverpool, on 19 July 1966, in which he was assisted by Wales' Leo Callaghan and England's Ken Dagnall.

During that game he failed to send João Morais from the field of play after a double foul on Pelé. In 2010, The Telegraph listed it among the 10 worst refereeing errors in World Cup history.

The official Sheffield United website mentions his death when crediting him with being co-founder (along with Derek Dooley) of the "Senior Blades Club", for over-60 supporters.

References

1922 births
FIFA World Cup referees
FA Cup Final referees
2001 deaths
1966 FIFA World Cup referees
English football referees